Ashculme is a village in Devon, England.

Villages in Devon